This is a list of army divisions serving within the British Empire during the Second World War. Military formations within the British Empire were generally not static and were composed of a changing mix of units from across Britain, its colonies and the dominions. As a result military formations within the Empire and Commonwealth are not easily attributable to specific Imperial or national entities and naming conventions do not necessarily correlate with modern country names. 
 "formed from" indicates that a new division was created in part from another division
 "formerly" indicates a simple division name change

Australia

 1st Australian Infantry
 2nd Australian Infantry
 3rd Australian Infantry
 4th Australian Infantry
 5th Australian Infantry
 6th Australian Infantry
 7th Australian Infantry
 8th Australian Infantry
 9th Australian Infantry
 10th Australian Infantry
 11th Australian Infantry
 12th Australian Infantry "Northern Territory Force"
 1st Australian Armoured
 2nd Australian Armoured
 3rd Australian Armoured

Canada

 1st Canadian Infantry
 2nd Canadian Infantry
 3rd Canadian Infantry
 3rd Canadian Infantry (CAOF)
 4th Canadian Infantry later 4th Canadian Armoured 
 5th Canadian Infantry later 5th Canadian Armoured 
 6th Canadian Infantry
 6th Canadian Infantry (CAPF)
 7th Canadian Infantry
 8th Canadian Infantry
 Veterans Guard
 4th Canadian Armoured formed from 4th Canadian Infantry 
 5th Canadian Armoured formed from  5th Canadian Infantry

New Zealand
 1st New Zealand Infantry
 2nd New Zealand Infantry
 3rd New Zealand Infantry
 4th New Zealand Infantry
 5th New Zealand Infantry

South Africa
 1st Mounted Command
 1st South African Infantry later 6th South African Armoured
 2nd South African Infantry
 3rd South African Infantry
 6th South African Armoured

See also
 List of British divisions in World War II 
 List of Indian divisions in World War II
 List of British Empire brigades of the Second World War
 List of British Empire corps of the Second World War
 Military history of the British Commonwealth in the Second World War

Notes

References

Infantry Divisions (British Army and British Indian Army) 1930 - 1956
 British Army formations

External links
 British, Commonwealth, and Empire Orders of Battle on 3 September 1939

Divisions of World War II
Lists of military units and formations of World War II
 
British World War II divisions
Military units and formations of the British Army in World War II
Lists of divisions (military formations)
Infantry divisions of the British Army in World War II
British Empire-related lists